The Cl−-formate exchanger, otherwise known as Pendrin encoded by the SLC26A4 gene, is a transport protein present in the kidney, where it functions in the renal chloride reabsorption. It is also present in vascular smooth muscle and cardiac muscle.

References

Transport proteins